The Château de Carbonat is a French castle located in Arpajon-sur-Cère, in Cantal (Auvergne). It gradually fell to ruins, but was extensively restored in the early twentieth century.

It has French terraced gardens and a landmark park.

Records indicate that in the past it served to protect the northern entrance of the Aurillac basin.

See also
 List of castles in France

Castles in Auvergne-Rhône-Alpes
Cantal